Koloonella coacta, common name the forced pyramid-shell,  is a species of sea snail, a marine gastropod mollusk in the family Murchisonellidae, the pyrams and their allies.

Distribution
This marine species occurs off the Northern Territory, Queensland and Tasmania.

References

 May, W.L. (1923). An Illustrated Index of Tasmanian Shells. Hobart : Government Printer. 100 pp.
 Laseron, C. (1959). The family Pyramidellidae (Mollusca) from northern Australia. Australian Journal of Marine and Freshwater Research. 10 : 177-267, figs 1-213
 Iredale, T. & McMichael, D.F. (1962). A reference list of the marine Mollusca of New South Wales. Memoirs of the Australian Museum. 11 : 1-109

External links
 To World Register of Marine Species
 Simon Grove: A guide to the seashells and other marine moilluscs of Tasmania : Koloonella coacta

Murchisonellidae
Gastropods described in 1886